The Last Bright Light is the third studio album by rock band Mostly Autumn. It is the first album to feature drummer Jonathon Blackmore and bassist Andy Smith. It is the only Mostly Autumn album on which Angela Gordon receives a writing credit.

Track listing
"...Just Moving On" (Josh) – 1:30
"We Come and We Go" (Josh) – 4:36
"Half the Mountain" (Josh) – 5:22
"The Eyes of the Forest" (Findlay/Josh) – 2:53
"The Dark Before the Dawn" (Josh/Jennings/Faulds) – 5:10
"Hollow" (Jennings) – 6:08
"Prints in the Stone" (Josh/Davison) – 3:27
"The Last Bright Light" (Josh) – 8:34
"Never the Rainbow" (Findlay/Jennings) – 3:48
"Shrinking Violet" (Findlay/Josh) – 8:34
"Helms Deep" (Josh) – 6:45
"Which Wood?" (Gordon) – 2:45
"Mother Nature" (Josh) – 12:09

Personnel
Bryan Josh – Lead/Backing Vocals; Lead/Rhythm/Acoustic/12 String Guitars; Gregorian Vocals (Track 8)
Heather Findlay – Lead/Backing Vocals; Bodhran; Tambourine; Bells
Iain Jennings – Keyboards; Synthesisers; Hammond Organ; Gregorian Vocals (8); Backing Vocals (2,5,6 and 9)
Angela Gordon – Flute; Recorders; Renaissence Recorders; Backing Vocals (10)
Liam Davison – Co-Lead Vocals (7); Acoustic/12 String Guitars; Slide Guitars (1,2 and 10)
Andy Smith – Bass Guitars
Jonathan Blackmore – Drums

Additional personnel
Troy Donockley – Low Whistles (7 and 10)
Albert Dannenmenn – Renaissence Recorders (8 and 11); Krumhorn (8 and 11); Rauschpfeife (8); Hummelden (11); Gaita (11); Gregorian Vocals (8)
Marissa Claughan – Cello (4,6 and 10)
Mark Atkinson – Gregorian Vocals (8); Backing Vocals (2,3,10 and 13)
Janine Atkinson – Backing Vocals (2,3,10 and 13)
Graham Hodge – Backing Vocals (2,3,10 and 13)
Nicole Smith – Children's Vocals (10)
Tabitha Buck – Children's Vocals (10)
Produced and engineered by John Spence at Fairview Studio, Willerby, Hull.

References

External links
 
 

Mostly Autumn albums
2001 albums